Efe Arda Koyuncu (born 8 July 2005) is a Turkish professional footballer who plays as a centre-back for Süper Lig club İstanbul Başakşehir.

Career
Koyuncu is a youth product of Bayrampaşa Demirspor, Haliç, and İstanbul Başakşehir, before joining the latter's senior team in 2022. On 13 April 2022, he signed his first professional contract with İstanbul Başakşehir, keeping him at the club until June 2025. He made his professional debut with İstanbul Başakşehir in a 0–0 Süper Lig tie with Galatasaray on 7 May 2022, where he was a starter and played the entire match. At 16 years old and 10 months, Koyuncu is the youngest professional debutant in the history of İstanbul Başakşehir, taking the record from Ravil Tagir.

International career
Koyuncu is a youth international for Turkey, having represented the Turkey U17s.

References

External links
 

2005 births
Living people
Footballers from Istanbul
Turkish footballers
Turkey youth international footballers
İstanbul Başakşehir F.K. players
Süper Lig players
Association football defenders